Frank Anthony Eufemia (born December 23, 1959) is a former Major League Baseball relief pitcher who played in 39 games for the Minnesota Twins in the  season.  He was drafted by the Twins in the 18th round of the 1982 Major League Baseball draft. His 1985 season was his only one in the majors; he returned to the minor leagues with the Toledo Mud Hens, the Twins’ Triple-A affiliate, for 1986 and was out of baseball the next season.

In 1992, Eufemia returned to organized baseball in the New York Mets’ minor league system, pitching for the Tidewater Tides. He once again left baseball following the season and never pitched in a major league team’s system again, although in 1995 he was one of many considered as replacement players during the ongoing strike.

Eufemia made one last comeback in 1998, where at the age of 38 he joined the New Jersey Jackals of the independent Northeast League for their inaugural season. Pitching exclusively as a starter for the first and only time in his baseball career, Eufemia started eleven games for the Jackals and went 5-1 for the eventual league champions.

Eufemia grew up in Bergenfield, New Jersey
 and attended Bergenfield High School.

Eufemia currently teaches physical education at Pascack Hills High School, in Montvale, New Jersey.

References

External links

1959 births
Living people
Bergenfield High School alumni
Major League Baseball pitchers
Minnesota Twins players
People from Bergenfield, New Jersey
Sportspeople from Bergen County, New Jersey
Sportspeople from the Bronx
Baseball players from New York City
Ramapo Roadrunners baseball players
New Jersey Jackals players
Baseball players from New Jersey
Orlando Twins players
Tidewater Tides players
Toledo Mud Hens players
Visalia Oaks players
Wisconsin Rapids Twins players